Sam McCartan (born 1999/2000) is a Gaelic footballer who plays for the St Loman's club and at senior level for Westmeath county team. He scored a goal against Laois in the 2022 Tailteann Cup. He passed the ball to Lorcan O'Toole for a second goal in the semi-final that got them past Offaly and into the competition's inaugural final.

McCartan is a grandson of Seán Purcell and is related to Ciarán Kilkenny.

Honours
Westmeath
 Tailteann Cup (1): 2022

Individual
 Tailteann Cup Team of the Year (1): 2022

References

Year of birth missing (living people)
Living people
St Loman's Gaelic footballers
Westmeath inter-county Gaelic footballers